Hidden Figures is a 2016 American film loosely based on the book by Margot Lee Shetterly.

Hidden Figures or Hidden Figure may also refer to:

 Hidden Figures (book), nonfiction by Margot Lee Shetterly
 Hidden Figures (picture book), by Margot Lee Shetterly

 Operation Hidden Figure, Brazil

See also
 Hidden figure of crime